Forstmann is a German surname. Notable people with the surname include:

 Arnold Forstmann (1842-1914), German artist
 Gustav Forstmann (1908-1985), German naval commander
 Judith Forstmann (died 2009), Argentinian politician
 Julius Anthony (Tony) Forstmann, businessman
 Nicholas C. Forstmann aka "Nick" (1947-2001), businessman
 Theodore J. Forstmann aka "Ted" (1940-2011), businessman
 Walther Forstmann (1883-1973), German U-boat commander

See also
 Forstmann Little & Company
 ForstmannLeff (founded 1968), founded by J. Anthony Forstmann and Joel B. Leff 
 Förstemann

German-language surnames